Victor Mendy (born 22 December 1981) is a Senegalese professional footballer who plays as a striker for Blanc Mesnil SF in Championnat National 3. Previously Mendy has played in France for Villemomble Sports, Paris FC, FC Metz and Clermont Foot, Turkey for Bucaspor, Azerbaijan for Gabala and India for NorthEast United.

Career

Club

Paris FC
Mendy's career was launched at Paris FC, where he scored 12 goals in 30 games in the Championnat National. His performance attracted the attention of FC Metz.

Metz and Clermont
Mendy signed a three-year professional contract with Ligue 1 Metz on 1 June 2007, but was loaned to Ligue 2 side Clermont Foot before playing a game. His professional debut for Clermont came on 14 September 2007, in a 1–1 draw at FC Gueugnon. He scored his first professional goal a week later, the opening goal in a 3–0 home win against Dijon FCO. When he returned from his loan spell, Metz had been relegated from Ligue 1, and he never got to play at that level.

Bucaspor
In June 2010, Mendy moved to Turkey to join Bucaspor.

Gabala
In the summer of 2011, Mendy signed a two-year contract with Azerbaijan Premier League side Gabala FC, taking the number 9 jersey. He made his debut in the first game of the season against Baku in a 0–0 draw on 7 August 2011. His first goal for Gabala came in the 37th minute of the fourth game of the season away to Qarabağ in a game that finished in a 0–1 victory to Gabala. He ended his first season in Gabala with 9 goals in all competitions. In his second season Mendy scored 6 times in 26 appearances in all competitions to leave him in joint 2nd place in Gabala's all time goal scorers chart with Deon Burton and Yannick Kamanan on 15. During Gabala's 4-0 Victory over Baku on 29 April 2012, Mendy  scored Gabala's 300th goal. On 15 September 2013, Mendy scored in Gabala's 1–2 away victory over AZAL to become the club's all-time leading League goal scorer with 17.

Mendy left Gabala at the end of the 2014–15 season, after four-years with the club he'd scored 33 goals in 127 games.

North East United
On 13 November 2015, it was announced that Victor would be joining Indian Super League team North East United FC as replacement for injured striker Boubacar Sanogo.

Blanc Mesnil
In 2016 he returned to France, linking up with his old coach Alain Mboma at Blanc Mesnil SF. The side won promotion to Championnat National 3 in summer 2017 as part of the re-structure of the fifth tier of the French football league system.

Career statistics

References

External links



1981 births
Living people
Footballers from Dakar
Senegalese footballers
Association football forwards
Senegalese expatriate footballers
Ligue 1 players
Ligue 2 players
Süper Lig players
Paris FC players
Clermont Foot players
Villemomble Sports players
FC Metz players
Bucaspor footballers
Gabala FC players
Expatriate footballers in Turkey
Senegalese expatriate sportspeople in Turkey
Expatriate footballers in Azerbaijan
Senegalese expatriate sportspeople in Azerbaijan